Sayyid Muhammad can point to:

 Mohammed Abdullah Hassan - emir of Diiriye Guure
 Sayyid Muhammad Khan -  Khan of the Khanate of Khiva